The 1972 North Carolina gubernatorial election was held on November 7, 1972. Republican nominee James Holshouser defeated Democratic nominee Skipper Bowles with 51% of the vote. Holshouser thus became the first Republican elected governor of the state in the 20th century.

Primary elections
Primary elections were held on May 6, 1972.

Democratic primary

Candidates
Skipper Bowles, State Senator
Hoyt Patrick Taylor Jr., incumbent Lieutenant Governor
Reginald A. Hawkins, civil rights activist and dentist
Wilbur Hobby, labor union leader
C. Eugene Leggett
Zeb V.K. Dickson

Results

Republican primary

Candidates
James Holshouser, State Representative
Jim Gardner, former U.S. Representative
Leroy Gibson
Thomas E. Chappell

Results

General election

Candidates
Major party candidates
James Holshouser, Republican
Skipper Bowles, Democratic

Other candidates
Arlis F. Pettyjohn, American

Results

References

1972
North Carolina
Gubernatorial